Saint-Élix-Theux is a commune in the Gers department in southwestern France.

Geography
The Petite Baïse flows north through the eastern part of the commune.

Population

See also
Communes of the Gers department

References

Communes of Gers